Peloids are allochems that are composed of micrite, irrespective of size, shape, or origin. The two primary types of peloids are pellets and intraclasts. Another type of peloid is pseudo-oolith.

References

Limestone